Grewingkia is a genus of extinct Paleozoic corals, found in Indiana. It contains at least one species, Grewingkia canadensis.

References

Rugosa
Prehistoric Hexacorallia genera
Paleozoic life of Ontario
Paleozoic life of Alberta
Paleozoic life of British Columbia
Paleozoic life of Manitoba
Paleozoic life of the Northwest Territories
Paleozoic life of Nunavut
Fossil taxa described in 1862